Priscilla Coleman may refer to:

 Priscilla K. Coleman, American academic
 Priscilla Coleman (artist), UK court room sketch artist